Stadt Hannover II (English: Hanover City 2) is an electoral constituency (German: Wahlkreis) represented in the Bundestag. It elects one member via first-past-the-post voting. Under the current constituency numbering system, it is designated as constituency 42. It is located in central Lower Saxony, comprising the southern part of the city of Hanover.

Stadt Hannover II was created for the inaugural 1949 federal election. Since 2017, it has been represented by Yasmin Fahimi of the Social Democratic Party (SPD).

Geography
Stadt Hannover II is located in central Lower Saxony. As of the 2021 federal election, it comprises the northern part of the city of Hanover, specifically the districts of Ahlem-Badenstedt-Davenstedt, Döhren-Wülfel, Mitte (excluding Oststadt and Zoo), Herrenhausen-Stöcken (only Herrenhausen), Kirchrode-Bemerode-Wülferode, Linden-Limmer, Nord (only Nordstadt), Ricklingen, and Südstadt-Bult.

History
Stadt Hannover II was created in 1949, then known as Stadt Hannover-Süd. In the 1965 through 1976 elections, it was named Hannover II. It acquired its current name in the 1980 election. In the inaugural Bundestag election, it was Lower Saxony constituency 19 in the numbering system. From 1953 through 1961, it was number 41. From 1965 through 1998, it was number 37. In the 2002 and 2005 elections, it was number 42. In the 2009 election, it was number 43. Since the 2013 election, it has been number 42.

Originally, the constituency comprised the city quarters of Badenstedt, Döhren, Wülfel, Kirchrode, Kleefeld, Limmer, Linden, and Ricklingen. In the 1965 through 1976 elections, it comprised the area of the city south of the Seelze–Hannover Hauptbahnhof–Lehrte railway line. It acquired its current borders in the 1980 election.

Members
The constituency has been held continuously by the Social Democratic Party (SPD) since its creation. Its first representative was Kurt Schumacher, the first post-war leader of the SPD, who served from 1949 until his death in 1952. Ernst Winter won the resulting by-election, and served less than a year before being succeeded by new SPD leader Erich Ollenhauer in the 1953 federal election. He served until his death in 1963. Helmut Rohde was elected in the 1965 election, and served until 1987. He was succeeded by Edelgard Bulmahn. In 2017, she was succeeded by Yasmin Fahimi, who was re-elected in 2021.

Election results

2021 election

2017 election

2013 election

2009 election

References

Federal electoral districts in Lower Saxony
Hanover
1949 establishments in West Germany
Constituencies established in 1949